or  is a lake in the municipality of Hattfjelldal in Nordland county, Norway. The Norwegian National Road 73 runs on the southern shore of the lake on its way from the village of Hattfjelldal to the village of Tärnaby in Sweden.

See also
 List of lakes in Norway
 Geography of Norway

References

Lakes of Nordland
Hattfjelldal